is a former Japanese football player and manager. He managed Japan women's national team.

Coaching career
Ohashi was born in Iga on October 27, 1959. After graduating from Osaka University of Health and Sport Sciences, he became coach for youth team at Japan Football Association. In 2004, he became manager for Singaporean new club, Albirex Niigata Singapore. November 2004, he became manager for Japan women's national team. He managed for 2008 Summer Olympics qualification and qualified for 2008 Summer Olympics. He also managed for 2007 FIFA Women's World Cup.

References

1959 births
Living people
Osaka University of Health and Sport Sciences alumni
Association football people from Mie Prefecture
Japanese footballers
Japanese football managers
Japan women's national football team managers
Association footballers not categorized by position
Albirex Niigata Singapore FC managers
2007 FIFA Women's World Cup managers